Petahya is a moshav in central Israel. Located in the Shephelah near Mazkeret Batya, it falls under the jurisdiction of Gezer Regional Council.

History
The village was established in 1951 by immigrants from the Tunisian youth movement HaNoar HaTzioni. They were later joined by immigrants from Algeria and India. It was initially named Gezer 10, but later renamed Petahya, a word derived from "a personal name in [the] Bible .. (I Chron. 24:16)". 

Today, the main agricultural activity is vineyard cultivation.

References

Algerian-Jewish culture in Israel
Indian-Jewish culture in Israel
Moshavim
Populated places established in 1951
Populated places in Central District (Israel)
Tunisian-Jewish culture in Israel
1951 establishments in Israel